Ping Shan Central  is one of the 39 constituencies in the Yuen Long District of Hong Kong.

The constituency returns one district councillor to the Yuen Long District Council, with an election every four years.

Ping Shan Central constituency is loosely based on central part of Ping Shan with estimated population of 15,036.

Councillors represented

Election results

2010s

References

Ping Shan
Constituencies of Hong Kong
Constituencies of Yuen Long District Council
2015 establishments in Hong Kong
Constituencies established in 2015